Levan II Dadiani (also Leon; ; 1597-1657) was a member of the House of Dadiani and ruler of the Principality of Mingrelia in western Georgia.

Levan grew up in Kakheti under his grandfather King Alexander II, but at the age of fourteen became prince of Mingrelia when his father Manuchar I died in a hunting accident. 

In the 1620s, Levan engaged in armed conflict alongside Abkhazia and Gurieli against King Giorgi III of Imeretia. He subsequently accused his Abkhazian first wife of adultery, cut off her ears and nose and cast her from Mingrelia. He then invaded and looted Abkhazia, poisoned his two sons, abducted and married the wife of his uncle. He then repeatedly raided Imeretia, confiscating livestock and taking hostages for ransom. In 1646 he destroyed the walls of Kutaisi with cannonfire and plundered the country. He blinded Prince Mamuka of Imereti, who had been planned as the future king to unite Georgia, for resisting his actions. This prompted King Rostom of Kartli, his brother in law (married to his sister), to solemnly curse him. 

Throughout Levan's forty-six year reign he was known for practicing various forms of barbarity, mutilation and torture. He normalized the practice of holding prisoners for ransom, making war more profitable among warlords in western Georgia. He also encouraged commerce from foreign merchants and was known as a competent administrator. He spurred the practice of goldsmithing and used large amounts of wealth for the decoration of churches and monuments.

In March 1657, while despairing over his son's corpse, he struck himself with a staff and dropped dead.

References 

1597 births
1657 deaths
House of Dadiani
17th-century people from Georgia (country)